O. californica  may refer to:
 Oenothera californica, the California evening primrose, a flowering plant species native to parts of the southwestern United States and Baja California
 Orcuttia californica, the California Orcutt grass, a rare grass species native to southern California and northern Baja California
 Orobanche californica, the California broomrape, a plant species native to western North America
 Osmia californica, a mason bee species native to North America

See also
 List of Latin and Greek words commonly used in systematic names#C